The Armenian Apostolic Diocese of Lebanon is an Oriental Orthodox Christian diocese (or eparchy) of the Armenian Apostolic Church in Lebanon. It is within the ecclesiastical jurisdiction of the Catholicossate of the Great House of Cilicia, seated in Antelias. The Diocese of Lebanon is currently headed by Primate of Lebanon, Archbishop Nareg Alemezian.

Armenian Apostolic Diocese of Lebanon is an independent church body running the religious and social affairs of the sizable Armenian Orthodox population in Lebanon. It is headquartered in Beirut, Lebanon with additional offices established in Bourj Hammoud, a suburb of Beirut. The seat of the Armenian Primate of Lebanon is in St. Vartanants Armenian Apostolic Church in Borj Hamoud near Harboyan Centers

The former Primate of Lebanon, archbishop Aram Keshishian was elected in 1995 as Catholicos of the Great House of Cilicia, with style His Holiness Aram I. He was succeeded by archbishop Kegham Khatcherian, who retired in 2014.

See also
 Armenians in Lebanon

References

External links
Official site

Lebanon
Armenian Apostolic Church in Lebanon
Oriental Orthodox dioceses in Asia